Boone County is a county located in the U.S. state of Illinois. As of the 2020 census, the population was 53,448. Its county seat is Belvidere.

Boone County is included in the Rockford, IL Metropolitan Statistical Area.

History
Unlike most of Illinois, much of Northern Illinois was not submerged in a shallow prehistoric sea. As a result, bedrock found in the area now bounded as Boone County is almost entirely Ordovician, as opposed to nearby counties like McHenry and Carroll which contain large areas of later Silurian bedrock. Till and outwash from the Illinoian glaciation covers area bedrock to a depth of several hundred feet. The county's proximity to the driftless area protected the region somewhat from the more recent Wisconsin glaciation. As a result, the county's northern townships resemble a driftless-like area, with higher peak elevations and more surface detail compared to the southern townships dominated by the broad flood plains of the Kishwaukee River and its tributaries. 

By the time of the first identified human settlements, the region was made up of thickly wooded forested hills and grassy prairie plains. Archeological study at the Koster Site seems to indicate that humans had established complex societies ten thousand years ago along the river basins of the Illinois and Mississippi. By the time of European exploration, Upper Mississippian culture collapsed; westward expansion forced many Algonquin-speaking nations into conflict with each other as they moved after encroachment of their lands. Potowatomi and Mascouten tribes were still living in the region when white settlers arrived and statehood was declared in 1818. 

As a political institution, Boone County was formed in 1837 out of Winnebago County. It was named for Kentucky frontiersman Daniel Boone.
The first non-Native American settlers arrived in what is now Boone County in 1835.  They arrived as a result of the end of the Black Hawk War as well as the completion of the Erie Canal.  They consisted entirely of settlers from New England. These were "Yankee" settlers, that is to say they were descended from the English Puritans who settled New England in the colonial era.  They were primarily members of the Congregational Church though due to the Second Great Awakening many of them had converted to Methodism and some had become Baptists before coming to what is now Boone County.  When the New England settlers arrived in what is now Boone County there was nothing but a dense virgin forest and wild prairie.  In the late 1870s immigrants began arriving from Germany and Ireland.

Geography

Adjacent counties
 Rock County, Wisconsin - north
 Walworth County, Wisconsin - northeast
 McHenry County - east
 DeKalb County - south
 Ogle County - southwest
 Winnebago County - west

Major highways
  Interstate 90
  US Route 20
  Illinois Route 76
  Illinois Route 173 
Logan Avenue county route 40   
Genoa Road (T-40)  
Garden Prairie Road county route 41   
Poplar Grove Road county route 32   
Capron Road (T-41)

Climate and weather 

Demographics

As of the 2020 United States Census, there were 53,448 people, 18,799 households, and 13,580 families residing in the county. The racial makeup of the county was 72.5% white, 2.3% black or African American, 1.2% Asian, 0.9% American Indian, 11.6% from other races, and 11.4% from two or more races. Those of Hispanic or Latino origin made up 24.1% of the population. The most common reported ancestries were German (23.7%), Irish (11.7%), Italian (7.4%), and Swedish (7.4%).

Of the 18,799 households, 31.7% had children under the age of 18 living with them, 55.5% were married couples living together, 10.6% had a female householder with no husband present, and 27.8% were non-families. 23.3% of all households were made up of individuals, and 13.0% had someone living alone who was 65 years of age or older. The average household size was 2.82 and the average family size was 3.33.

The county's age distribution consisted of 24.7% under the age of 18, 9.4% from 18 to 24, 23.1% from 25 to 44, 27.1% from 45 to 64, and 15.6% who were 65 years of age or older. The median age was 38.7 years. For every 100 females, there were 99.0 males.

The median income for a household in the county was $70.396 and the median income for a family was $84,450. Males had a median income of $50,213 versus $30,219 for females. The per capita income for the county was $32,659. About 5.0% of families and 8.2% of the population were below the poverty line, including 10.5% of those under age 18 and 6.8% of those age 65 or over.

2020 Census

Education
 Belvidere Community Unit School District 100
 Harvard Community Unit School District 50
 Hiawatha Community Unit School District 426
 North Boone Community Unit School District 200
 Rockford School District 205

Communities

Cities
 Belvidere

Villages
 Caledonia
 Capron
 Cherry Valley (mostly in Winnebago County)
 Poplar Grove
 Timberlane

Census-designated places
 Argyle
 Beaverton Crossroads
 Blaine
 Candlewick Lake
 Edgewood
 Garden Prairie
 Herbert
 Hunter
 Irene
 Prairie View
 Russellville

Townships
Boone County is divided into these nine townships:

 Belvidere
 Bonus
 Boone
 Caledonia
 Flora
 Leroy
 Manchester
 Poplar Grove
 Spring

Government
Boone County is located in the Boone-Winnebago County Regional Office of Education #4.

Boone County, with neighboring Winnebago County, is located in Illinois's 17th Judicial Circuit. The entirety of Boone County, along with portions of southeastern Winnebago County, is in the third subcircuit.

Politics

As a historic Yankee settlement, Boone County in its early years was a major base for the Free Soil Party, being one of nine Illinois counties to vote for Martin van Buren in 1848. Its Free Soil affinities meant Boone became one of the first strongholds of the Republican Party and remained overwhelmingly Republican for the following century, although it did vote for Progressive Theodore Roosevelt in 1912 when the Republican Party was severely split. Between at least 1892 and 1928 no Democratic Presidential candidate ever managed twenty percent of the county's vote, and in the century up to 1960 no Democrat reached thirty percent – a degree of GOP loyalty comparable to such famous bastions as Owsley County in Kentucky, Grant County in West Virginia, or Avery County in North Carolina. Even Barry Goldwater, who alienated the Yankee Northeast so much as to lose all but one county there, still won Boone County by 15.6 percentage points, and between 1968 and 1988 no Democrat did better than Jimmy Carter’s 40.2 percent.

The shift of the Republican Party towards an expanded Southern and Western base, and particularly its growing strength with social conservatives, alienated the Yankee North during the 1990s and 2000s, but Boone County remained in Republican hands.  The candidacy of Ross Perot in 1992 and 1996 caused George H. W. Bush and Bob Dole both to win Boone County with mere pluralities against Bill Clinton, and in 2008, Illinois resident Barack Obama became the only Democrat to carry the county since James K. Polk in 1844. The 2010s have seen a reversal of this Democratic trend due to concern over employment declines in the “Rust Belt."

See also
 National Register of Historic Places listings in Boone County, Illinois
 List of Boone County, Illinois topics

References

Further reading
 History of Boone County, Illinois. Salem, MA: Higginson Book Co., 1998.
 The Past and Present of Boone County, Illinois: Containing a History of the County — Its Cities, Towns, Etc.; A Biographical Directory of Its Citizens; War Record of Its Volunteers in the Late Rebellion; Portraits of Early Settlers and Prominent Men; General and Local Statistics; History of the Northwest; History of Illinois; Constitution of the United States; Map of Boone County; Miscellaneous Matters; Etc., Etc. Chicago: H.F. Kett and Co., 1877.

External links
 United States Census Bureau 2007 TIGER/Line Shapefiles
 United States Board on Geographic Names (GNIS)
 United States National Atlas

 
1837 establishments in Illinois
Illinois counties
Populated places established in 1837